Clinton is a family name.

Clinton may also refer to:

Places

Australia
 Clinton, Queensland
Clinton, South Australia (disambiguation), various places on the Yorke Peninsula
 County of Clinton, Queensland

Canada
Clinton, British Columbia
Clinton, Ontario

New Zealand
Clinton, New Zealand

United Kingdom
Aston Clinton, a village and civil parish in Buckinghamshire, England
Baddesley Clinton, a moated manor house near Warwick, England

United States
Clinton, Alabama
Clinton, Arkansas
Clinton, California, in Amador County
Clinton, Oakland, California, in Alameda County
Clinton, Connecticut
Clinton (CDP), Connecticut
Clinton Village Historic District (Clinton, Connecticut), listed on the NRHP in Connecticut
Clinton, Georgia
Clinton, Illinois
Clinton Nuclear Generating Station
Clinton, Indiana, in Vermillion County
Clinton, Ripley County, Indiana
Clinton, Iowa
Clinton, Kansas
Clinton, Kentucky
Clinton, Louisiana
Clinton, Maine, a New England town
Clinton (CDP), Maine, the main village in the town
Clinton, Maryland
Clinton, Massachusetts, a New England town
Clinton (CDP), Massachusetts, the main village in the town
Clinton, Michigan (disambiguation), several places
Clinton, Minnesota
Clinton, Mississippi
Clinton, Missouri, in Henry County
Clinton, Phelps County, Missouri
Clinton, Montana
Clinton, Nebraska
Clinton, New Jersey
Clinton, Manhattan, New York, an alternate name for Hell's Kitchen
Clinton, Clinton County, New York
Clinton, Dutchess County, New York
Clinton, Oneida County, New York
Clinton Village Historic District (Clinton, New York)
Clinton, North Carolina
Clinton, Ohio
Clinton, Oklahoma
Clinton, Pennsylvania
Clinton, South Carolina
Clinton, Tennessee
Clinton, Texas (disambiguation), multiple places
Clinton, Utah
Clinton, Virginia
Clinton, Washington
Clinton, West Virginia (disambiguation), multiple places
Clinton, Wisconsin (disambiguation), multiple places
Clinton Park, Houston, Texas, a neighborhood

Other places
 Castle Clinton, New York City
 Camp Clinton, a World War II prisoner of war facility in Clinton, Mississippi
 CFB Clinton, a Canadian Forces Base near Clinton, Ontario
 Clinton Correctional Facility, Dannemora, New York
 Clinton State Park, Kansas
 Clinton River, Michigan
 Clinton Road, West Milford, New Jersey
 Port Clinton, Ohio
 Port Clinton, Pennsylvania
 DeWitt Clinton High School, Bronx, New York
 Success Academy Clinton, former name of Success Academy Hell's Kitchen, part of Success Academy Charter Schools
 Clinton Engineer Works, US government facility that produced enriched uranium for the Manhattan Project during World War II

Ships
Clinton, a Canadian tug, formerly steamboat Daring
Clinton (steam ferry), an 1853 steam ferry used on the San Francisco Bay in California
, multiple ships of the United States Navy

Botany
Clinton's bulrush is a common name for Trichophorum clintonii, a species of flowering plant native to eastern North America
Clinton's lily is a common name for Clintonia, a genus of flowering plants native to North America and Asia
Clinton's wood fern is a common name for Dryopteris clintoniana, a species of fern native to the northern hemisphere

Other uses
Clinton (automobile), a Canadian automobile built from 1911 to 1912
Clinton (band), a side project of Cornershop
Clinton (film), a 2012 biographical film about former President Bill Clinton
Clintons, British greeting card company
Clinton (given name)
Clinton (grape), a variety of grape

See also
Clinton College (disambiguation)
Clinton County (disambiguation)
Clinton Hill (disambiguation)
Clinton station (disambiguation)
Clinton Township (disambiguation)
Glinton (disambiguation)